Rees's Cyclopædia, in full The Cyclopædia; or, Universal Dictionary of Arts, Sciences, and Literature was an important 19th-century British encyclopaedia edited by Rev. Abraham Rees (1743–1825), a Presbyterian minister and scholar who had edited previous editions of Chambers's Cyclopædia.

Background

When Rees was planning his Cyclopædia, Europe was in the aftermath of the French Revolution, and during serialised publication (1802–1820) the Napoleonic Wars and War of 1812 occurred. Britain absorbed into its empire a number of the former French and Dutch colonies around the world; Romanticism came to the fore; evangelical Christianity flourished with the efforts of William Wilberforce; and factory manufacture burgeoned.

With this background, philosophical radicalism was suspect in Britain, and aspects of the Cyclopædia were thought to be distinctly subversive and attracted the hostility of the Loyalist press. Contributors Jeremiah Joyce and Charles Sylvester had attracted the attention of the government and were tried for their views. The editor and authors went to great pains to emphasise their Englishness, to the extent of anglicising many French words: the French Kings Louis appear under the heading "Lewis".

Scientific theorising about the atomic system, geological succession, and earth origins; natural history (botany, entomology, ornithology and zoology); and developments in technology, particularly in textiles manufacture, are all reflected in the Cyclopædia.
Other topics include exploration and foreign travel which provide insights into how the world was viewed at that time. Agriculture and rural life also feature greatly.

Format
The Cyclopædia appeared serially between January 1802 and August 1820, and ran to 39 volumes of text and 6 volumes of plates including an atlas. It contains around 39 million words, and around 500 of the articles are of monograph length. The sheets were produced weekly, and issued as half-volume sets several times a year. The dates of these can be seen on table 4.1 below. Only one set of the work in half-volumes (which also has some of the paper wrappers) is known to survive, in the library of the Natural History Museum, London.

Plates

The plates were published in 6 volumes: four covering general articles, one on natural history, and one atlas. They were issued as blocks and so do not appear to have been issued with the texts in the half-volumes. There are 1107 plates, and atlas with 61 folded maps 16" by 10" in size. Bound at the back of Volume 39 are lists of all the plates and an index to them.

Later editions
The American edition was published by Samuel F. Bradford (see :fr:Samuel F. Bradford), of Philadelphia. Bradford was a member of the famous family of American printers. The first volume appeared in May 1806 and the last in December 1820. The work extended to 41 volumes of text and 6 of plates. See section 5 below.

The growth of industrial archaeology led to the reprinting in the 1970s by the British publisher David and Charles of volumes covering manufacturing industry, naval architecture, and horology.

In the 1980s the Swiss publishing house IDC produced a microfiche edition.

Background, reception, scholarship
The first decades of the 19th century saw many encyclopaediae published in Britain. Examples included:
The fourth, fifth and sixth editions of Encyclopædia Britannica in 20 volumes, 1801–1810, 1815–1817, and 1823–1824.
Encyclopædia Perthensis or Universal Dictionary of Arts, Science and Literature, 23 volumes, Edinburgh 1807.
Edinburgh Encyclopædia, 18 volumes, 1808–1830, ed. David Brewster.
British Encyclopedia, or Dictionary of Arts and Sciences, 6 volumes, 1809, ed. William Nicholson.
Pantologia, 12 volumes, 1813, ed. John Mason Good, Olinthus Gregory, Newton Bosworth.
Encyclopædia Metropolitana, 28 volumes, 1817–1845, edited initially by Samuel Taylor Coleridge
Encyclopaedia Londinensis 24 volumes,1810–1828, including 3 volumes of plates, ed. John Wilkes
These sources commonly fed off each other, and writers often contributed to more than one.

The Cyclopædia had comparatively little reception on publication. The Anti-Jacobin Review published hostile reviews of half-volume 1 in 1802, and of volumes 2–4 in 1804-5. These reviews complained about its supposed antireligious aspects and radical standpoints attributed to its editor and contributors, and cited lack of article balance, confusing alphabetisation, and cross-references to then-unpublished volumes. The British Critic less stridently criticised lack of balance and confusion in volume 1. The Panoplist carried a serial review of both editions of Rees by Jedediah Morse in 1807–1810.

The Quarterly Review commented, "Rees is the most extensive cyclopædia in English with many excellent articles it has generally been condemned as on the whole too diffuse and too commonplace."

The exhaustive article on encyclopaediae in the Encyclopædia Britannica, 11th edition (1910) mentions Rees's involvement with the editing of the original Chambers, but ignores completely the later work. The 15th edition of Britannica mentions Rees's Cyclopædia superficially.

Rees's Cyclopædia seems to be in limbo in modern published studies of reference books. Superseded by more modern works and ignored by larger scholarship, the Cyclopædia received modern scholarly attention from students of the history of science and the history of technology, after research into the life and times of Charles Burney and his writings on music. In 1948 Percy Scholes published his biography The Great Dr Burney, 2 vol., and devoted a chapter to Burney's work for Rees. Scholes had his own copy of the work and used it profitably to discuss in some detail the faults of the work, in particular, the way the serial production caused major problems when editors were faced with new knowledge that appeared after the volume containing the appropriate section had been issued. They addressed this partially with an appendix in the last volume, and also by inventing contorted new subject titles in the main work ("Cotton Manufacture", Vol. 10, 1808, and "Manufacture of Cotton", Vol. 21, 1812). Later writers about Burney have investigated further his involvement with Rees. (See list of sources, below).

The Cyclopædia lacks a classified index volume, and alphabetising is on occasion eccentric ("York, New").

The Rees Project
The Rees Project was instigated by June Zimmerman Fullmer (1920–2000), a professor at Ohio State University, an authority on Humphry Davy and the chemistry of the early 19th century. Her work drew her to Rees and she indexed it. After tapping the invisible college of scholars who knew of Rees, she convened a summer 1986 meeting in London, following which she wrote a proposal to the American Foundation for the Humanities for funding to the project, setting out the object of producing a printed concordance to the contents of the Cyclopædia. This was intended to make Rees much more widely accessible to the modern reader. Funding was not forthcoming, and the matter lapsed.

Printing
Rees's Cyclopædia was printed by Andrew Strahan, the King's Printer. It was entirely hand-set (there being no mechanical means of composition at this date) and printed. At the commencement of the work Strahan had nine wooden presses and over 20,000 kg of type. Since the Cyclopædia was produced serially, with a few sheets being printed each week, only a small part of Strahan's men and equipment would have ever been used on it at any one time. The paper is wove, with no chain lines. One watermark in the paper has been noted, with the legend W BALSTON, 1811. The supplier has not been identified, but it may be significant that a J. Dickinson was a member of the publishing syndicate.

According to McKerrow's formula this size of typeface was Long Primer. The typefounder is unknown, but the article on "Printing" in Volume 28 had, bound with the text, specimens of type cast by Fry and Steele of London and Alexander Wilson of Glasgow. Greek and Hebrew faces were sometimes used and occasionally special chemical, pharmaceutical, and other symbols appear.

The work followed the common practice of the time of conflating the entries for I and J and U and V into single lists.

At first a half-volume cost 18 shillings, and a large paper version with proof copies of the plates cost £1 16 shillings (according to the prospectuses). By 1820 the parts sold for £1 and £1 16 respectively. It is not clear if these prices were for the parts in wrappers. At the end of the project the work sold for £85 in the quarto edition and was reputed to have cost Longmans nearly £300,000. Most sets of Rees today are bound in calf, with two parts to the volume, but the quality of the leather used has meant that in many cases the hinges have rotted and the covers loosened, necessitating rebinding.

The publication of Rees followed the common system of a number of booksellers banding together to share the cost and eventual profit: the conger (syndicate). The syndicate comprised Longman, Hurst, Rees, Orme, & Brown, Paternoster Row; F. C. and J. Rivington, publisher to the SPCK (publishers of the British Critic); A. Strahan, King's Printer; and 24 smaller concerns. The full list is on the work's title page.

No records of the publication survive, since the papers of Longmans were destroyed when their premises in Paternoster Row, London, were burnt out in the Blitz on the night of 29–30 December 1940.

Publication dates

Content 
Coincident with the appearance of volume 39, all 39 volumes, A through Z, were published as a set in 1819. The primary publishers of this set were the consortium of Longman, Hurst, Rees (who by then apparently held an equity share), Orme, and Brown, of Paternoster Row.

However, correct dating by half-volume or fascicle (1802–1820) can have serious implications for the accuracy of citations by modern writers, especially when discussing scientific priority: a list compiled in 1820 in Philosophical Magazine was designed to give proper priority to scientific discoveries. Volumes of plates were issued in blocks, and not with the texts to which they refer.

Botanical historian Benjamin Daydon Jackson, unaware of this list, attempted to compile a list based on contemporaneous advertisements in the trade press, on dates appearing on the plates (having assumed that the plates were issued at the same time as the accompanying texts), and some guesswork. He published his first list privately in 1877, he issued a corrected version in 1880, and a final version appeared in the Journal of Botany in 1896. Only 3 of Jackson's dates accord with the 1820 dates listed above.

Citation style
Hundreds of articles in Rees are very long, and the work is unpaginated, so page reference is not easy. The following convention was adopted by the Rees Project, and is based on the method described by R. B. McKerrow. Each gathering has 8 pages, and each page 2 columns. The reference is cited by volume or half-volume details with accurate date between 1802 and 1820, article title, and then the gathering's identifier, the page, and the column, separated by colons. The page containing the gathering identifier (e.g., "B") is page 1 in each gathering (e.g., page "B:1"). Page 3 in each gathering typically contains the gathering identifier plus the figure 2 and should be ignored (e.g., "B2" appears on page "B:3").

The account of the bell-crank steam engine may be referenced as "" ("O" is the 8-page gathering's identifier.)

The gatherings in a typical volume of Rees are identified as follows. In each sequence the letters J and W are omitted and one letter U or V used but not both together.

22 running from "B" to "Z"
23 running from "Aa" to "Zz"
23 running from "3A" to "3Z"
23 running from "4A" to "4Z"
23 running from "5A" to "5Z" or as far as needed

The David and Charles reprint of some of the manufacturing articles is paged, and many writers cite this pagination, which is useless for consulting the original article from a full set. These reprints are also not comprehensive, as they omit short pieces under about 350 words.

References in Rees's Cyclopaedia articles
The long encyclopaedic articles in Rees commonly have a note at the end of the articles to the sources used in writing them. In other articles source references are run into the text. These are normally in a short-title form that will need decoding. Frequently these are in the format of surname of the author and a one or two word abbreviation of the book title. Collected works are similarly treated.

Thus, a small example covering biography:

 Bayle = Pierre Bayle, Dictionnaire Historique et Critique 1697
Biog. Brit. = William Oldys, Biographia Britannica, 6 vol, 1774-1766
Gen. Biog. = John Aikin et al. General biography or lives, critical and historical, of the most eminent persons of all ages, countries, conditions, and professions, arranged according to alphabetical order., 10 vol, 1799–1815
Gen. Dict. = Thomas Birch, General Dictionary...[of biography], 10 vol, 1734–41
Eloy, Dict. Hist. = , Dictionnaire Historique de la Medicine Ancienne at Moderne, 4 vol, 1778
Haller, Bib. Bot. = Albrecht von Haller, Bibliotheca Botanica, 2 vol, 1771
Haller, Bib. Chir. = Albrecht von Haller, Bibliotheca Chirurgica, 2 vol, 1774
Haller, Bib. Anat. = Albrecht von Haller, Bibliotheca Anatomica, 2 vol, 1774
Haller, Bib. Med. Pract. = Albrecht von Haller, Bibliotheca Medicinae Practicae, 4 vol, 1776–88
Laborde = Jean-Benjamin François de la Borde, Essai sur la musique ancienne et moderne 4 vol, 1780
Moreri = Louis Moréri, Le grand Dictionaire historique, ou le mélange curieux de l'histoire sacrée et profane 1674. The encyclopaedia focused particularly on historical and biographical articles.  It was translated into English, German, Italian, Dutch and Spanish. A total of at least 20 different editions were published between 1674 (one volume) and 1759 (10 volumes).

Other sources cited include the Philosophical Transactions of the Royal Society and similar scientific publications, commentaries relating to biblical scholarship and accounts of travels.

Notable articles

Approximately 500 articles exceed 15 columns (11,000 words). The longest article is "Canal", by John Farey, Sr., 289 columns (210,000 words). John Landseer wrote 4 articles on schools of European engraving totalling over 600 columns (460,000 words).

Biographical articles

Rees's Cyclopaedia has 3789 biographical articles half a page (350 words) and longer, as well as numerous briefer ones. They range in time from Antiquity to the eighteenth century. Benjamin Heath Malkin, and Thomas Rees are noted as having written biographical articles, but there is no information about which. The rest of the authors cannot be positively identified except for William Tooke, who wrote about Catherine the Great. Many of the biographical articles are sourced to the biographical reference books noted in 3.3 above. In most cases Christian names are Anglicised – John for Johannes, for example.

The music articles

These were written by Charles Burney (1726–1814), with additional material by John Farey, sr (1766–1826), and John Farey, Jr (1791–1851), and illustrated by 53 plates as well a numerous examples of music typset within the articles. Charles Burney was well-known as the author of A General History of Music, 4 vol 1776–1789 and two travel diaries recording his Musical Tours collecting information in France and Italy, and later Germany, 1+2 vol, 1771 and 1773, as well as the Commoration of Handel, 1785 and his Musical Memoirs of Metastasio, 1796. John Farey, sr was a polymath, well known today for his work as a geologist and for his investigations of mathematics. He was greatly interested in the mathematics of sound, and the schemes of temperamant used in tuning musical instruments then, and published much about it in contemporary periodicals. His son, John Farey, jr, was also polymathic in his interests. He contributed numerous drawings for the illustrations of mostly technological and scientific topics in Rees, and would have written the descriptions of them. They are always linked by key-letters to the details of the drawings. The procedure would have been for Farey to make the drawing first, after usually inspecting and measuring the object, then write the description of it, with the key letters, which were then engraved on the plate for final printing. The plates for dramatic machinery, the organ and barrel organ are by him.

Contributors

The Cyclopædia was written by about 100 contributors, most of whom were Nonconformists. They were specialists in their fields, covering science, technology, medicine, manufacturing, agriculture, banking and transportation, as well as the arts and humanities. A number were members of the teaching staffs of the Royal Military Academy, and the Addiscombe Military Seminary of the East India Company. Other contributors were working journalists who wrote for scientific, medical and technical periodicals. Several of the contributors were active in radical politics; one was gaoled for sedition and another indicted for treason.

Amongst the eminent writers engaged by Rees were Dr Lant Carpenter (1780–1870) on education, mental and moral philosophy; Tiberius Cavallo (1799–1809) on electricity and magnetism; John Flaxman (1755–1826) on sculpture; Luke Howard (1772–1867) on meteorology; John Landseer (1769–1852) on engraving; Sir William Lawrence, (1783–1867) on human and comparative anatomy; Sir James Edward Smith (1759–1828) on botany; David Mushet on metallurgy and chemistry; Rev. William Pearson (1767–1847) on astronomy; Sir Thomas Phillips (1770–1875) on painting.

Among the artists and engravers employed were Aaron Arrowsmith (1750–1823) who engraved the maps; William Blake (1757–1827) who made engravings to illustrate some of the sculpture articles; Thomas Milton (1743–1827) who engraved most of the natural history plates; Wilson Lowry (1762–1824) who engraved numerous of the plates especially those relating to architecture, machinery and scientific instruments.

Except for some of the botanical articles by Sir James Edward Smith, none of the articles are signed. Names were recorded in the Prospectus of 1802, the introduction at the start of the first volume, the paper covers of the unbound parts which have survived, and in a paper in the Philosophical Magazine, published in 1820. The alphabetical List of contributors to Rees's Cyclopædia has been compiled from the foregoing sources. The majority appear in the Dictionary of National Biography, and in sources listed in the British Biographical Index, but these accounts rarely record an involvement with the Cyclopædia.

American edition

The American edition was published by Samuel F. Bradford, of Philadelphia.(see :fr:Samuel F. Bradford). Bradford was a member of the famous family of American printers. The first volume appeared in May 1806 and the last in December 1820. The work extended to 41 volumes of text and 6 of plates. There were 1,851 subscribers recorded. The initial print run was set at 2,500 copies, but Bradford was beset by financial problems, and the project passed to Murray, Draper Fairman and Company who reduced the run to 2,000 copies. The work sold at $4 per half volume or $8 per volume. The full bound set cost $400 in 1820.

The religious content of the first volumes was re-written to reflect American sensibilities by Bishop William White, an Episcopalian, and Ashbel Green a Presbyterian. Additional American material was incorporated into the text.

References and sources
References

Chronological list of sources
Anon, Dr Rees's New Cyclopædia – On Saturday, 2 January 1802, will be published..., 3 page printed prospectus, 1801
Anon, Dr Rees's New Cyclopædia – Samuel F. Bradford is preparing to publish by subscription .... 1 page broadside prospectus of the American edition, n. d. [c.1805] 
Anon., Review of Vol 1 in the Annual Review and History of Literature, vol 1, 1802, pp 859–66
Anon., Review of Vol 1 in the Anti-Jacobin Review, vol 12, 1802, pp 178–90 and vol 13, 1802, pp 40–53
Anon., Review of Vols 2, 3 and 4 in the Anti-Jacobin Review, vol 19, 1804, pp 365–376 and vol 20, 1805, pp 44–55
Anon., Review of Vol 1 in the British Critic, vol 25/26, 1805, pp 225–244 and vol 27/28, 1806, pp 64–77
Morse, Jedediah, comparative reviews of both editions in The Panoplist, Vol 3, 1807, pp 129–134, 178–183, 270–274, 507–511, Vol 4 (N.S. vol 1) 1808-9, pp 131–138, 177–183, 214–217, 273–274, 318–324, 368–371, 407–413, 514–518, Vol 5, (N.S. Vol 2) 1809–10, pp 29–34, 81–85, 123–127.
Anon., Review in Eclectic Review, vol 5, 1809, pp 551–552
Anon., Review in Ackermann's Repository, vol 2, 1816, p 307
Anon., Review in Gentleman's magazine, vol 84, pt 1, 1816, pp 539–40

Anon, Notice of the completion of the publication of the work, Monthly Repository, 1820, vol 15, p 624

Scholes, P. A., The Puritans and Early Music in England and New England, OUP, 1934 [Occasional references to Burney's articles in Rees]
Scholes, P. A.,  The Oxford Companion to Music, 1938 (and later eds) [Frequent citations to Burney's Rees articles, and also some illustrations from the work.]
Scholes, P. A., 'A New Enquiry into the Life and Work of Dr Burney', Proceedings of the Musical Association 67th Session, 1940–1941, pp 1–30. [pp 24–5 has section 'Burney an Encyclopaedist'.]
Scholes, P. A.,  The Great Dr Burney, 1948, Vol 2, pp 184–201, chapter LVIII, "Virtues and vagaries of a septuagenarian encyclopædist" [Throughout his biography Scholes made reference to, and some times quoted from, Burney's articles in Rees.]
Mackarness, E. D. 'Dr Burney, Biographer', The Contemporary Review, vol 189 (1956) pp 352–357. [A brief account of Burney's biographical writings, including those in Rees.]
Scholes, P. A., Dr Burney's Musical Tours in Europe, 2 vol, OUP 1959, [Scholes makes a number of references to, and quotations from Burney's Rees articles]
Oldman, C.B., 'Dr Burney and Mozart', Mozart Jahnbuch 1962/63. (1964), pp 73–81. [Includes extracts from Burney's Rees articles about Mozart.]
Bentley, G. E. jr., & Nurmi, Martin K., A Blake Bibliography, Annotated lists of Works, Studies, and Blakeana, University of Minnesota Press, Minneapolis, 1964, pp 145–148. [Detailed discussion of the 7 plates that William Blake engraved for the Cyclopaedia.]
Lonsdale, Roger, Dr Charles Burney: a Literary Biography, OUP 1965, pp 407–431, chapter X, "Burney and Rees's Cyclopædia"
{{cite journal | last1 = Ferguson | first1 = Eugene S. | year = 1968 | title = 'Cast Iron Aqueduct in Rees's Cyclopædia''' | journal = Technology and Culture | volume = 9 | issue = 4 | pages = 597–600 | doi=10.2307/3101903| jstor = 3101903 }}
Cossons, Neil, ed., Rees's Naval Architecture 1819–20, 1 vol, Publisher: David and Charles, 1970
Cossons, Neil, ed., Rees's Clocks, Watches and Chronometers, 1 vol, Publisher: David and Charles, 1970
Cossons, Neil, ed., Rees's Manufacturing Industry, 5 vol, Publisher: David & Charles, 1972
Harte, N. B., 'Rees's Watches Chronometers and Naval Architecture : A Note', Maritime History III 1973, 92–5
Harte, N. B., "On Rees's Cyclopædia as a source for the history of the textile industries in the early nineteen century," Textile History, 5, 1974, pp 119–127.
Rowland, K. T., Eighteenth Century Inventions David & Charles, 1974 [Draws extensively from the Rees plates as illustrations]
Pestana, Harold R., 'Rees's Cyclopædia (1802–1820) a sourcebook for the history of geology,  Journal of the Society for the Bibliography of Natural History, (1979), 9, (3), 353–361.
Lonsdale, Roger, 'Dr Burney's 'Dictionary of Music' ',Musicology Australia, vol. 5, no. 1, pp. 159–171, 1979 [An account of Burney's Rees articles, with criticism of Scholes's discussion of them.] 
Kassler, Jamie Croy, The Science of Music in Britain: A Catalogue of writings, Lectures and Inventions, 2 vol, Garland, 1979 [Both Burney and Farey sr. appear often in the Index. Rees's Cyclopaedia and music is discussed at pp 1200–1204.]
Jeremy, David J., Transatlantic Industrial Revolution, Blackwells, 1981. [Makes use of the textile machinery illustrations and other information]
Stafleu, F. A., and Cowen, R. S., Taxonomic Literature 2ed (1983), vol 4, pp 631–635 [Detailed account of the bibliographic make-up of the volumes and plates. Includes the information that a William Fitt Drake contributed material about botany He does not appear in any of the sources that make up the list of contributors above.]
Mabberley, D. J., ' "Anemia", or, the Prevention of Later Homonyms' Taxon, vol 32, No 1 (Feb 1983) pp 79–87. [Has at pp 80–81 an account of Sir J. E. Smith and the Supplementary portion of Rees's Cyclopaedia. Concerns botanical articles.]
Grant, Kerry S., Dr Burney as Critic and Historian of Music. UMI Research Press, Ann Arbor, Michigan, 1983.[Throughout this book Grant made reference to, and some times quoted from, Burney's articles in Rees.]
F. A. S., [F. A. Stafleu], The Rees Cyclopaedia: The Cyclopaedia or, Universal Dictionary of Arts, Sciences and Literature, London, Longman, Hurst, Rees, 1802–1820 by A. Rees, Taxon Vol 35, No 2 (May, 1986) pp 452–453. [A review of the IDG microfilm publication of Rees. Makes the point the work had not been adequately studied from the standpoint of the history of science.] 
Klima, Slava, Bowers, Garry, and Grant, Kerry S., Memoirs of Dr Charles Burney, 1726–1769, University of Nebraska Press. Lincoln and London, 1988.[Throughout this book the authors made reference to, and frequently quoted from, Burney's articles in Rees.]
Kafker, Frank A., Notable Encyclopedists of the Eighteenth Century: Successors of the Encyclopedie, Publisher: The Voltaire Foundation, 1994. [Contains some material about the American edition]
Woolrich, A. P., "John Farey, Jr., technical author and draughtsman: his contribution to Rees's Cyclopædia". Industrial Archaeology Review, 20, (1998), 49–68 AIA Abstracts 1998
Coad, JonathanThe Portsmouth Block Mills: Bentham, Brunel and the start of the Royal Navy's Industrial Revolution, English Heritage, 2005 [Material from Rees's Cyclopaedia was used to inform Chapter 6 'The Beginnings of Mass Production'. See Portsmouth Block Mills ]
Jeremy, David J. and Darnell, Polly C., Visual Mechanic Knowledge: The workshop drawings of Isaac Ebeneezer Markham (1795–1825), New England Textile Mechanic, Pub. Memoirs of the American Philosophical Society, Vol 263, 2010, pp 335–344 [An extensive account of the textiles material in the two versions of the Cyclopædia].
 Macmillan, David M, 'Abraham Rees,The Cyclopædia ', 2015. [This is an important online resource discussing the quality of the digitised versions of the plates in the Cyclopaedia. It investigates the 50-odd plates illustrating the Horological articles, and is an ongoing project, so subject to revision.]
 Woolrich, A. P., Dr Burney and Rees's Cyclopaedia, Burney Letter, vol 23 no 1 Spring, 2017, pp 1, 2, 10-11 [This discusses Charles Burney's contribution to the Cyclopaedia on music. The Burney Letter is published by the Burney Society. ISSN 1703-9835.]
 Woolrich, A. P.,  Consolidated edition of the Music Biographies from Rees's Cyclopaedia, (1802-1819), Burney Letter, vol 23 no 2 Fall, 2017, pp 6–7. [This is an edited version of the fuller introduction to the biographies.]
 Woolrich, A. P., The General music articles in Rees's Cyclopaedia by Dr Charles Burney, John Farey, Sr. & John Farey, Jr., Burney Letter, Vol 25 No 2, Spring. 2019. pp 1, 6-7, 12.

External links

93 digitised articles on all aspects of textiles from the British edition can be found on the On-Line Digital Archive of Documents on Weaving Related Topics at Arizona State University. http://www.cs.arizona.edu/patterns/weaving/articles795.html
The text and plates of the music articles can be found on the web page of the Burney Centre, McGill University. The music articles and biographies are by Charles Burney, the music theory articles are by John Farey Sr., and the technical articles describing the construction of musical instruments are by John Farey Jr.  https://www.mcgill.ca/burneycentre/resources/online-texts#Charles%20Burney%20(1726-1814)

Digitised copies

British
 + via Hathi Trust

Vol 1 (A – Amarathides)
Vol 2 (Amarantus – Arteriotomy)
Vol 3 (Artery – Battersea)
Vol 4 (Battery – Bookbinding)
Vol 5 (Book-keeping – Calvart)
Vol 6 (Calvary – Castra)
Vol 7 (Castramentation – Chronology)
Vol 8 (Chronometer – Colliseum)
Vol 9 (Collision – Corne)
Vol 10 (Cornea – Czyrcassy)
Vol 11 (D – Dissimilitude)
Vol 12 (Dissimulation – Eloane)
Vol 13 (Elocution – Extremities)
Vol 14 (Extrinsic – Food)
Vol 15 (Food – Generation)

Vol 16 (Generation – Gretna Green)
Vol 17 (Gretry – Hibe)
Vol 18 (Hibiscus – Increment)
Vol 19 (Increments – Kilmes)
Vol 20 (Kiln – Light)
Vol 21 (Light-house – Machinery)
Vol 22 (Machinery – Mattheson)
Vol 23 (Matthew – Monsoon)
Vol 24 (Monster – Newton-in-the-Willows)
Vol 25 (Newtonian Philosophy – Ozunusze)
Vol 26 (P – Perturbation)
Vol 27 (Pertussis – Poetics)
Vol 28 (Poetry – Punjoor)
Vol 29 (Punishment – Repton)
Vol 30 (Republic – Rzemien)

Vol 31 (S – Scotium)
Vol 32 (Scotland – Sindy)
Vol 33 (Sines – Starboard)
Vol 34 (Starch – Szydlow)
Vol 35 (T – Toleration)
Vol 36 (Tolerium – Vermelho)
Vol 37 (Vermes – Waterloo)
Vol 38 (Water – Wzetin)
Vol 39 (X – Zytomiers with Addenda)
Plates Vol 1 (Agriculture – Astronomy)
Plates Vol 2 (Basso-Relievo – Horology)
Plates Vol 3 (Hydraulics – Naval architecture) 
Plates Vol 4 (Navigation – Writing by cipher)
Plates Vol 5 (Natural History)
Plates Vol 6 (Atlas)

The digitised version of the Atlas is linked from the HathiTrust because the Internet Archive lacks the volume.

American
. Published 1806–1820

Vol 1) (A – Alzum)
Vol 2) (Am – Arkwright)
Vol 3) (Arl, Gross – Barnera)
Vol 4) (Barnes – Blast)
Vol 5) (Blast – Bunius)
Vol 6) (Bunkers Hill – Captain’s clerk)
Vol 7) (Captainry – Chan-Cban)
Vol 8) (Chance – Classification)
Vol 9) (Classification – Condemnation)
Vol 10) (Condensation – Cranmer)
Vol 11) (Crannichfeld – Degree)
Vol 12) (Degree – Duck Island)
Vol 13) (Duck – Epitetus)
Vol 14) (Epucurians – Fence)
Vol 15) (Fence – Frederick I)
Vol 16) (Frederick III– Gibraleon)

Vol 17) (Gibraltar – Gypsophela)
Vol 18) (Gypsum – Hookah)
Vol 19) (Hooke – Inse)
Vol 20) (Insects – Kzikein)
Vol 21) (L – Lindey) 
Vol 22) (Line – Magic pictures)
Vol 23) (Magician – Mboteley)
Vol 24) (Meaco – Monsoons)
Vol 25) (Monster – New Thames)
Vol 26) (Newton, Sir Isaac – Ox-Feet)
Vol 27) (Oxford – Periplysis)
Vol 28) (Peripneunomy – Plasher)
Vol 29) (Plashing – Prosopolpsia)
Vol 30) (Prosopoeia – Refrangible)
Vol 31) (Refrangibility – Ros Sur Couesnon)
Vol 32) (Rosa – Satureia)

Vol 33) (Saturn – Sheapey)
Vol 34) (Shepreve – Sparaxis)
Vol 35) (Sparending – Stuart, James)
Vol 36) (Stuart, Gilbert – Testaceous) 
Vol 37) (Testament – Tropatena)
Vol 38) (Trope – Vitetz)
Vol 39) (Vitex – Water clock)
Vol 40) (Water-colours – Yamanchalonskoi)
Vol 41) (Yamasla – Ztomiers with Addenda & Corregenda)] 
Plates Vol 1) (Agriculture – Astronomy)
Plates Vol 2) (Basso-Relievo – Horology)
Plates Vol 3) (Hydraulics – Naval architecture)
Plates Vol 4) (Navigation – Writing by cipher)
Plates Vol 5 (Natural History)
Plates Vol 6 (Atlas)

 
English-language encyclopedias
British encyclopedias
1802 non-fiction books
19th-century encyclopedias